Critic Te Ārohi is the official magazine of the Otago University Students' Association (OUSA) of the University of Otago. It is freely available around both the university's campus and selected sites in Dunedin city weekly during term time. Critic is New Zealand's longest-running student newspaper, having been established in 1925. Weekly circulation is 5,000 copies, with an estimated readership of approximately 20,000.

Content 
Critic's content is primarily targeted to cater for its student demographic and often examines provocative, controversial, taboo and arguably offensive subject matter. Traditionally, critic has had 'themed' issues such as "The Sex Issue" or "The Drugs Issue", however, recent years have seen a movement away from overtly stipulated themes. Although content varies year to year, generally the publication covers a wide variety of local, national and international news, politics; as well as weekly features and columns. Content is generally written through a student perspective, and targeted towards a student audience.

In 2019, Critic Te Ārohi published a story about a landlord breaching tenancy laws. After receiving a threatening letter in response, Critic made headlines for publishing the email on the cover of the following issue.

In 2021, Critic published a series of articles detailing the findings of a six-month undercover investigation by Critic journalist Elliot Weir into Action Zealandia, a white supremacist organisation in New Zealand.

Controversy 
The Office of Film and Literature Classification in 2006 banned an issue of the magazine, due to it containing a "how-to-guide" on drug rape. Possession or distribution of this issue was deemed illegal.

In 2010 The Press Council upheld a complaint against Critic over the article 'The Bum at the Bottom of the World', which depicted three people the publication deemed homeless and vagrant.
	
In 2013 Critic's Editor Callum Fredric received a $35,000 payout after a series of personal disputes with OUSA General Manager Darel Hall. Fredric was suspended by Hall on Friday 3 May, and was trespassed from OUSA buildings by Hall after attending a meeting on Monday 6 May to explain the situation to staff, before being asked to leave by Police. After filing legal proceedings, Fredric accepted a $35,000 settlement package from OUSA on Friday 17 May, and resigned as Editor.

In 2018 Issue 12 featured a cartoon image of a woman menstruating.  The University of Otago Proctor Dave Scott took offence to the image and unilaterally decided to destroy all copies of the magazine. The university later apologised, saying the decision to remove the magazines was a “mistake”.

In 2020 Critic criticised Otago University's response to Covid-19 in an opinion piece, leading to the university refusing to answer media requests from Critic and threatening to pull advertising from the magazine.

Design 
The publication was tabloid in size until 2002, when it went quarterfold (around A4 size). The design of Critic is often significantly changed each year as new designers are employed. In 2011 Critic's Art Director, Andrew Jacombs, had the covers of Critic displayed in the 2012 Coverjunkie "Best Of" Publication, alongside some of the world's most leading titles, such as TIME, Esquire, The New Yorker, Vogue, Sports Illustrated and lift-outs from the New York Times and United Kingdom weekly The Sunday Times.

Awards and nominations
Critic Te Ārohi is a member of the Aotearoa Student Press Association (ASPA), and was awarded Best Publication in the annual ASPA awards in 2005, 2006, 2008, 2010, 2012, 2013, 2017, 2018, 2019, 2020, and 2021. 
In 2010 Critic won Best Publication, Best Editorial Writer, Best Paid News Reporter, Best Illustrator, and Best Series. The unanimous winner for 2010, Critic received the highest possible score from all judges and was praised for being "The only magazine this year that didn’t just ask the audience to notice how smart it was; instead, it went out and proved it by doing smart, creative, interesting things."
In 2011 Critic won Best Education Series, Best News Writer, Best Feature Writer and Best Feature.
In 2012 Critic won best publication, best editorial, best series and best website.
In 2013 Critic won best publication, best design, best cover, best reviewer, best columnist and best sports writer.
In 2014 Critic won Best Publication, Best Design, Best Feature Illustration and Best Feature Writer (2014 Aotearoa Student Press Awards).
In 2017 Critic won Best Publication, Best Feature Writer, Best News Writer, Best Sports Writer, and Best Headline. In 2021 Critic won Best Publication, Best Website, Best News Story, Best News Reporter, Best Feature Writer, Best Sports Reporter, Best Opinion Writer, and Best Editorial.

List of Critic Te Ārohi Editors

1925 - Douglas Archibald Campbell

1926 - co. W. G. McClymont and C. A. Sharp

1927 - co. J. A. Stallworthy and M. W. Wilson

1928 - co. A. M. Douglas and G. L. McLeod

1929 - co. I. G. Gordon and J. C. Dakin

1930 - co. G. S. Cox and G. C. Macdiarmid

1931 - co. G. C. Macdiarmid and E. Stephenson

1932 - H. A. Small (first half) and G. L. McLeod (second half)

1933 - F. W. Guest

1934 - F. W. Guest (first half) and Ralph G. Park (second half)

1935 - E. M. Elder

1936 - C. P. Powles (first half) and P. M. Lusk (second half)

1937 - Lloyd Woods

1938 - W. R. Geddles (first half) and co. W. R. Geddles and P. M. Lusk (second half)

1939 - N. V. Farrell

1940 - B. H. R. Hill

1941 - D. L. Matheson (first half) and N. F. Gilkison (second half)

1942 - Diana M. Shaw

1943 - Ronald Taylor (first half) and J. C. D. Sutherland (second half)

1944 - W. D. Trotter

1945 - co. Stephanie Wylie and Sheila Wilding (first half) and Stephanie Wylie (second half)

1946 - co. Joyce Richards and Valarie Seymour

1947 - co. Guy Hawley and Suzette Hawley

1948 - Eric Hill

1949 - Deirdre Airey

1950 - C. I. Patterson

1951 - M . E. D. Webster (first half) and co. Colin Newbury and Nigel Eastgate (second half)

1952 - Paul Oestreicher

1953 - John Irwin

1954 - co. Howard Clay and Geoff Adams (first half) and co. Howard Clay and John Stewart (second half)

1955 - Paul Thompson

1956 - Earle Wilson

1957 - Dennis Lenihan

1958 - Fraser Harbutt (second half only)

1959 - Fraser Harbutt (first half) and Allan Bruce (second half)

1960 - Allan Bruce (first half) and Peter Matheson (second half)

1961 - John Harris

1962 - Andrew Brown

1963 - co. Mel Dickson and Al Forrest

1964 - Don F. Gray

1965 - co. Roger Strong and Warren Mayne

1966 - Don F. Gray

1967 - Charles Draper

1968 - Charles Draper (first half) and Bob Dey (second half)

1969 - Mike Meek

1970 - Peter Dickson

1971 - John Robson

1972 - Hugh Maclean

1973 - co. David Peyton and John Keir

1974 - Jim Mora

1975 - Andrew Webb

1976 - Bronwyn Evans

1977 - Al Duncan

1978 - Belinda Carter

1979 - Belinda Carter

1980 - Simon Kilroy

1981 - Chris Trotter

1982 - Reid Perkins

1983 - Ray Ward

1984 - Andrew Johnstone

1985 - alternating Niels Reinsborg and Lydia Mabbett

1986 - co. for first half and then alternating Alexandra Tylee, Sam Elworthy, Grant Ramsey, Shelley Cooper, Andrew Vincent

1987 - co. Gill Plimmer, Hannah Zwartz, and Fiona Morris

1988 - Michael Tull

1989 - co. Nickee Charteris and Astrid Smeele

1990 - Emma Reid

1991 - Colin Peacock

1992 - Caroline McCaw

1993 - Colin Williscroft

1994 - Louise Johnstone

1995 - co. Victor Billot and Paul Dagarin

1996 - co. Leah McFall and Tracy Huirama-Osborne (first half) and Tracy Huirama-Osborne (second half)

1997 - co. Logan Sisley and Gavin Bertram

1998 - co. Brent McIntyre and Gavin Bertram

1999 - Brent McIntyre

2000-2001 - Fiona Bowker

2002-2003 - Patrick Crewdson

2004 - Hamish McKenzie

2005 - Holly Walker

2006 - John Ong

2007-2008 - David Large

2009 - Amy Joseph

2010 - Ben Thomson

2011 - Julia Hollingsworth

2012 - Joe Stockman

2013 - Callum Fredric (February–May) and Sam McChesney (May–October)

2014 - Zane Pocock

2015 - Josie Cochrane

2016 - Hugh Baird

2017 - Lucy Hunter

2018 - Joel MacManus

2019 - Charlie O’Mannin

2020 - Sinead Gill

2021 - Erin Gourley

2022 - Fox Meyer

References

External links
Critic's Official Site

1925 establishments in New Zealand
Free magazines
Magazines established in 1925
Mass media in Dunedin
Magazines published in New Zealand
Weekly magazines published in New Zealand
Student magazines
Student newspapers published in New Zealand
University of Otago